Blackgrass or black-grass or black grass may refer to:

Plants
 Black-grass, British common name for Alopecurus myosuroides, a damaging weed in wheat crops
 Black-grass rush or blackgrass, American common name for Juncus gerardii, a salt marsh plant used for facing dykes
 Black mondo grass, a cultivar of Ophiopogon planiscapus

Other uses
 Blackgrass (album), an album by Earl Lee Grace